The African American Cultural Heritage Action Fund is a program formed in 2017 to aid stewards of Black cultural sites throughout the nation in preserving both physical landmarks, their material collections and associated narratives. It was organized under the auspices of the National Trust for Historic Preservation. The initiative which awards grants to select applicants and advocates of Black history has been led by architectural historian Brent Leggs since 2019. It is the largest program in America to preserve places associated with Black history.

History
The program was conceived as a means towards creating greater resilience and capacity for sensitive and threatened places that tell the stories of the African diaspora. Support from the fund has aided the stabilization and restoration of numerous structures and properties from churches to cemeteries, from the Harriet Tubman Home in Auburn, New York to the Cleveland Public Theater in Ohio. The Fund has an advisory council which includes Ford Foundation president Darren Walker, literary critic and author Henry Louis Gates Jr., educator and historian Lonnie Bunch and actress Phylicia Rashad to name a few. Donors to the Fund have included philanthropist MacKenzie Scott who made a $20 million gift in 2021.

As of February 2022, the fund has raised $70 million. Since it was started, it has given grants to more than 200 preservation projects in overlooked communities. 

Simultaneously to fixing dilapidated or threatened bricks and mortar projects, the goal of the fund is also to effect social change in neglected neighborhoods. The award of monies for the reuse and revitalization of culturally meaningful structures and landscapes results in a positive benefit for marginalized residents. Restoration of the home of blues artist Muddy Waters for example is less about just repairing a house - it is also about creating a venue for other musicians to be inspired and perhaps record their own music.

Preserving Black Churches Project
According to Leggs, its executive director, the fund next plans to partner with Black churches as part of an investment in revitalizing community religious centers. A donation of $20 million to the Preserving Black Churches Project was announced on Martin Luther King Day in January 2022. The gift was made by the Lilly Endowment, one of the largest endowments in the United States.

Grantees
In 2018, $1 million was awarded to 16 projects.

 August Wilson House, (Pittsburgh, Pennsylvania)
 African American Homesteader Sites, (New Mexico, Colorado, Nebraska, Kansas, and South Dakota) 
 Buffalo Soldiers at Yosemite, (Yosemite, California)
 Civil Rights Sites of Birmingham, (Birmhingam, Alabama)
 Freedom House Museum and Virginia National Urban League Headquarters, Alexandria, Virginia)
 The Grand Old Lady, (Washington, D.C.)
 Historic Roxbury, (Boston, Massachusetts)
 John and Alice Coltrane Home, (Huntington, New York)
 Mars Hill Anderson Rosenwald School, (Marshall, North Carolina)
 Mary and Eliza Freeman Houses, (Bridgeport, Connecticut)
 Mountain View Black Officers Club, (Fort Huachuca, Arizona)
 Sarah Rector Mansion, (Kansas City, Missouri)
 Shockoe Bottom, (Richmond, Virginia)
 South Side Community Art Center, (Chicago, Illinois)
 Tuskegee University Rosenwald School Program, (Tuskegee, Alabama)
 Weeksville's Hunterfly Row Houses, (Brooklyn, New York)
 Wilfandel Clubhouse, (Los Angeles, California)

In 2019, $1.6 million was awarded to 22 projects and funding came through the Mellon Foundation.

 African Meeting House, (Boston, Massachusetts)
 Alabama Historical Commission, (Alabama)
 Clinton African Methodist Episcopal Zion Church, (Great Barrington, Massachusetts)
 Emanuel African Methodist Episcopal Church, (Charleston, South Carolina)
 Emmett and Mamie Till Interpretive Center (Sumner, Mississippi)
 Explored Landscapes of Afro-Virginia, (Virginia)
 The Forum (Chicago, Illinois)
 God's Little Acre, (Newport, Rhode Island)
 Harriet Tubman Home, (Auburn, New York)
 Historic Evergreen Cemetery, (Richmond, Virginia)
 Historic Westside Las Vegas, (Las Vegas, Nevada)
 Hutchinson House, (Edisto Island, South Carolina)
 Langston Hughes House, (Harlem, New York)
 McGee Avenue Baptist Church, Stuart Street Apartments, (Berkeley, California)
 Morris Brown College's Fountain Hall, (Atlanta, Georgia)
 Oregon Black Pioneers Corporation, (Oregon)
 Pauli Murray Home and Center for History and Social Justice, (Durham, North Carolina)
 Satchel Paige House, (Kansas City, Missouri)
 South Carolina African American Heritage Foundation, (South Carolina)
 Texas Endangered Historic Black Settlements & Cemeteries, (Texas)
 Treme Neighborhood Revival Grants Program, (New Orleans, Louisiana)
 Wright Building, (Deland, Florida)

In 2020, 27 grants were awarded totaling $1.6 million in funding.

 The Leona Tate Foundation for Change
 Muddy Waters Mojo Museum, (Chicago, Illinois)
 The Historic Vernon A.M.E Church, (Tulsa, Oklahoma)
 Paul Robeson House, (Philadelphia, Pennsylvania)
 Sweetwater Foundation, (Chicago, Illinois)
 Historic Mitchelville Freedom Park, (Hilton Head, South Carolina)
 The Clifton House, (Baltimore, Maryland)
 The Maxville Interpretative Heritage Center, (Joseph, Oregon)

In 2021, 40 recipients were recognized by the African American Cultural Heritage Action Fund and $3 million in monies was disbursed.

 African American Heritage Trail of Martha's Vineyard, (West Tisbury, Massachusetts)
 Alabama African American Civil Rights Consortium,(Birmingham, Alabama)
 Asbury United Methodist Church, (Washington, DC)
 Black American West Museum and Heritage Center, (Denver, Colorado)
 Cherokee State Resort Historical Park, (Hardin, Kentucky)
 Firestation 23, Byrd Barr Place (Seattle, Washington)
 Fort Monroe Foundation, (Fort Monroe, Virginia)
 4theVille, (St. Louis, Missouri)
 Georgia B. Williams Nursing Home, (Camilla, Georgia)
 Hampton University, (Hampton, Virginia)
 Hayti Heritage Center, St. Joseph's Historic Foundation, (Durham, North Carolina)
 Historic Athens, (Athens, Georgia)
 History Colorado, (Denver, Colorado)
 Hotel Metropolitan Purple Room, (Paducah, Kentucky)
 Houston Freedmen's Town Conservancy, (Houston, Texas)
 Huston-Tillotson University,(Austin, Texas)
 Indiana Landmarks, (Indianapolis, Indiana)
 Karamu House, (Cleveland, Ohio)
 The League of Women for Community Service, (Boston, Massachusetts)
 Montpelier Descendants Committee, (Orange, Virginia)
 Mount Zion Baptist Church, (Athens, Ohio)
 National Marian Anderson Historical Society and Museum, (Philadelphia, Pennsylvania)
 National Negro Opera Company, (Pittsburgh, Pennsylvania)
 New Granada Theater, Hill CDC (Pittsburgh, Pennsylvania)
 North Carolina African American Heritage Commission, (Raleigh, North Carolina)
 Oakland Public Library, (Oakland, California)
 Descendants of Olivewood Cemetery, (Houston, Texas)
 Palmer Pharmacy Building, Bluegrass Trust for Historic Preservation (Lexington, Kentucky)
 Para la Naturaleza,(San Juan, Puerto Rico)
 People's AME Zion Church, The People's Community Development Corporation, (Syracuse, New York)
 Prince Hall Masonic Lodge, (Atlanta, Georgia)
 Roberts Temple Church of God in Christ, (Chicago, Illinois)
 Robbins Historical Society and Museum, (Robbins, Illinois)
 City of Sacramento, (Sacramento, California)
 Sapelo Island Cultural and Revitalization Society, (Sapelo, Georgia)
 Save Harlem Now!, (New York, New York)
 St. Simon's African American Heritage Coalition, (St. Simon's, Georgia)
 Threatt Filling Station, (Luther, Oklahoma)
 Walnut Cove Colored School,(Walnut Cove, North Carolina)

References

External links
African American Cultural Heritage Action Fund

Cultural heritage of the United States
African-American cultural history